I Heard That Song Before is a suspense novel by American author Mary Higgins Clark.

Synopsis
The daughter of a landscaper for the wealthy Carrington family, six-year-old Kay Lansing sneaks away from her father's side one morning, and overhears a woman blackmailing a man for money. When she tells him that this will be the last time, he caustically responds: "I heard that song before". That same night teenager Susan Althrop, eldest son Peter Carrington‘s girlfriend, vanishes into thin air and is never seen again. Twenty-two years later, Peter, forty-two, now runs the family empire and has been widowed; his pregnant wife drowned in their swimming pool eight years ago. As fate would have it, Kay falls in love with Peter after she approaches him about hosting a literary luncheon, and the two promptly marry. However, his peculiar nocturnal habits soon set her teeth on edge, especially when he's unconsciously drawn to the place where the former Mrs. Carrington met her end...

Reception
The novel was a critical and commercial success, garnering the excellent reviews Clark has become accustomed to over the years.
 Clark deftly keeps the finger of guilt pointed in many directions until the surprising conclusion. - Publishers Weekly
 I Heard That Song Before once again dramatically reconfirms Mary Higgins Clark's worldwide reputation as a master storyteller. - Barnes & Noble

References

2007 American novels
Novels by Mary Higgins Clark